The 1958 Memphis State Tigers football team was an American football team that represented Memphis State College (now known as the University of Memphis) as an independent during the 1958 NCAA College Division football season. In their first season under head coach Billy J. Murphy, Memphis State compiled a 4–5 record.

Schedule

References

Memphis State
Memphis Tigers football seasons
Memphis State Tigers football